Rozwarówko  is a former settlement in the administrative district of Gmina Bobolice, within Koszalin County, West Pomeranian Voivodeship, in north-western Poland. As of 2010 it no longer figures in the national database of places.

For the history of the region, see History of Pomerania.

References

Villages in Koszalin County